Placemaking is a multi-faceted approach to the planning, design and management of public spaces. Placemaking capitalizes on a local community's assets, inspiration, and potential, with the intention of creating public spaces that improve urban vitality and promote people's health, happiness, and well-being. It is political due to the nature of place identity. Placemaking is both a process and a philosophy that makes use of urban design principles. It can be either official and government led, or community driven grassroots tactical urbanism, such as extending sidewalks with chalk, paint, and planters, or open streets events such as Bogotá, Colombia's Ciclovía. Good placemaking makes use of underutilized space to enhance the urban experience at the pedestrian scale to build habits of locals.

History

The concepts behind placemaking originated in the 1960s, when writers like Jane Jacobs and William H. Whyte offered groundbreaking ideas about designing cities that catered to people, not just to cars and shopping centers. Their work focused on the importance of lively neighborhoods and inviting public spaces. Jacobs advocated citizen ownership of streets through the now-famous idea of "eyes on the street." Whyte emphasized essential elements for creating social life in public spaces.

The term came into use in the 1970s by landscape architects, architects and urban planners to describe the process of creating squares, plazas, parks, streets and waterfronts that will attract people because they are pleasurable or interesting. Landscape often plays an important role in the design process.  The term encourages disciplines involved in designing the built environment to work together in pursuit of qualities that they each alone are unable to achieve.

Bernard Hunt, of HTA Architects noted that: "We have theories, specialisms, regulations, exhortations, demonstration projects. We have planners. We have highway engineers. We have mixed use, mixed tenure, architecture, community architecture, urban design, neighbourhood strategy.  But what seems to have happened is that we have simply lost the art of placemaking; or, put another way, we have lost the simple art of placemaking. We are good at putting up buildings but we are bad at making places."

Jan Gehl has said "First life, then spaces, then buildings – the other way around never works"; and "In a Society becoming steadily more privatized with private homes, cars, computers, offices and shopping centers, the public component of our lives is disappearing. It is more and more important to make the cities inviting, so we can meet our fellow citizens face to face and experience directly through our senses. Public life in good quality public spaces is an important part of a democratic life and a full life."

The writings of poet Wendell Berry have contributed to an imaginative grasp of place and placemaking, particularly with reference to local ecology and local economy. He writes that, "If what we see and experience, if our country, does not become real in imagination, then it never can become real to us, and we are forever divided from it... Imagination is a particularizing and a local force, native to the ground underfoot."

In recent years, placemaking has been widely applied in the field of Sports Management and the sports industry.  Often times, the idea of placemaking centers around urban real estate development, centralized around a stadium or sports district.

Principles 
According to Project for Public Spaces, successful placemaking is based on eleven basic principles:

The Community Knows Best 

An important aspect of placemaking is taking into account inputs of the people who will be using the public space most.  That is, to say, the community for which the public space is intended.  This is important because members of the community are likely to have useful insights into how the space does - or should - function, as well as a historical perspective of the area, and an understanding of what does and does not matter to other members of the community.

Places, Not Designs 

Placemaking is not just about designing a park or plaza with efficient pedestrian circulation.  It involves taking into account the interrelations between surrounding retailers, vendors, amenities provided, and activities taking place in the space, then fine-tuning the space with landscape changes, additions of seating, etc., to make all of those elements mesh.  The end result should be a cohesive unit that creates greater value for the community than just the sum of its parts.

Placemaking is a Group Effort 

Partners for political, financial, and intellectual backing are crucial to getting a public space improvement project off the ground.  These partners can range from individuals, to private or municipal institutions, to museums, to schools.

Make and Act on Observations 

By observing how a public space is used, it is possible to gain an understanding of what the community does and does not like about it.  This understanding can be used to assess what activities and amenities may be missing from the space.  Even after a public space has been built, observation is key to properly managing it, and evolving it to better suit the community's needs over time.

Requires a Vision 

As with many other types of project, a placemaking project needs a vision to succeed.  This vision should not be the grand design of a single person, but the aggregate conception of the entire community.

Requires Patience 

A placemaking project does not happen overnight.  Do not be discouraged if things do not go exactly as planned at first, or if progress seems slow.

Triangulate 

Triangulation, simply put, is the strategic placement of amenities, such that they encourage social interaction, and are used more frequently.  For example, "if a children's reading room in a new library is located so that it is next to a children's playground in a park and a food kiosk is added, more activity will occur than if these facilities were located separately."

Ignore Naysayers 
Just because it hasn't been done doesn't mean it can't be done.  What it does mean is that there are few people, in either the private or public sectors, who have the job of creating places.

Form Supports Function 
A public space's form factor should be formulated with its intended function(s) in mind.

Money Should Not Be an Issue 
If networking and team building have been executed correctly, public sentiment towards the project should be positive enough to overlook its monetary cost.

Placemaking is an Ongoing Process 
Placemaking is never "done".  Minor tweaks can be made to improve the space's usefulness to its community over time, and regular maintenance/upkeep of facilities and amenities is a fact of life.

Healthy Placemaking - The Link Between Place and Health 
Both the opportunities available to individuals and the choices made based on those opportunities impact individual, family, and community health. The World Health Organization's definition of health provides an appropriate, broad-reaching understanding of health as a "resource for everyday life, not the object of living" and an important frame for discussing the interconnections between Place and Health.  A 2016 report The Case for Healthy Places, from Project for Public Spaces and the Assembly Project, funded by the Knight Foundation and focusing on research related to Shaping Space for Civic Life both offer insight into the current evidence base showing how health and wellbeing are impacted by where you live and the opportunities available to you.

Connecting blueways and greenways through placemaking 
There is an increasing focus on using placemaking as a way to address the physical disconnect between the urban streams and greenways through placemaking.

The Arts and Creative Placemaking 
While the arts and creative expression play a substantial part in establishing a sense of place, economic growth and production must also play an equally large role in creating a successful place. These two factors are not mutually exclusive, as the arts and cultural economic activity made up $729.6 billion (or 4.2%) of the United States GDP in 2014, and employed 4.7 million workers in 2012. This means that the arts can be deployed as a powerful tool in the creation or rehabilitation of urban spaces.

Jamie Bennett, executive director of ArtPlace America, has identified the following four tools used by communities while implementing creative placemaking.

 Anchoring: When a key arts institution, organization, or building in the area prompts additional foot traffic or regional draw. These anchors can attract additional business, and become a strong source of identity for the neighborhood.
 Activating: When visual or performing arts are brought into the public realm, it activates the space while creating interest, activity, and engagement. More people and eyes on the street drives curiosity to explore and establishes a sense of safety.
 Fixing: Taking vacant, underutilized, or blighted spaces in a neighborhood and treating them as an opportunity for new art and design projects. This can change how people think about these spaces and the opportunities that they represent.
 Planning By using the arts and creative community meeting strategies, stakeholder enthusiasm can be bolstered, resulting in valuable input for community design. Bringing artists into the planning process can upend the familiar and allow participants to mentally "unhook" from their preconceived notions.

Community Attachment 
Great places must do more than meet the basic requirements if they want to foster greater community attachment. A strong sense of attachment can result in residents who are more committed to the growth and success of their community. The Knight Foundation conducted a study measuring community attachment, and found that there 
was very little variation in the primary drivers of attachment rates when compared between different cities across the United States.

Drivers of Attachment 

 Social Offerings - Gathering places that foster face-to-face interactions, building trust with others, and an environment where people care for one another. This includes perceptions of a healthy nightlife, an arts and cultural scene, and community events.
 Openness - How inclusive the community is to a wide range of people and lifestyles. Openness is measured by perception that the place is good for old people, racial and ethnic minorities, families and children, gays and lesbians, college grads looking for work, immigrants, and young adults without children.
 Aesthetics - The physical beauty of the place. Mostly focusing on the availability of open green space, parks, playgrounds, and recreational trails.

Attachment Trends

Livable Streetscapes 
Streets are the stage for activity of everyday life within a city and they have the most potential to be designed to harness a high-quality sense of place. Effective placemaking in the streetscape lends special attention to the streets livability by representing a sense of security, sense of place, visible employment, variety of transportation options, meaningful interactions between residents, "eyes on the street" as well as "social capital". All of these interactions take place at the mesoscale. Mesoscale is described as the city level of observation between macroscale—being birdseye view—and microscale--being textures and individual elements of the streetscape (streetlamp type, building textures, etc.); in other words, mesoscale is the area observable from a humans eyes, for example: between buildings, including storefronts, sidewalks, street trees, and people. Placemaking for a street takes place at both mesoscale and microscale. To be effective placemakers, it is important that planners, architects, and engineers consider designing in the mesoscale when designing for places that are intended to be livable by Whyte's standards.

Placemaking tools and practices 
Tools and practices of placemaking that benefit from utilizing the mesoscale context include:

Form-Based Codes
Infill Development
Urban Forestry PracticesCivil EngineeringArchitecture

Social Media and Placemaking 

As society changes to accommodate new technologies, urban planners and citizens alike are attempting to utilise those technologies to enact physical change. One thing that has had a massive impact on western society is the advent of digital technologies, like social media. Urban decision makers are increasingly attempting to plan cities based on feedback from community engagement so as to ensure the development of a durable, livable place. With the invention of niche social technologies, communities have shifted their engagement away from local-government-led forums and platforms, to social media groups on websites such as Facebook and Nextdoor to voice concerns, critiques and desires. In a sense, these new platforms have become a Third Place, in reference to Ray Oldenburg's term.

Social media tools such as these show promise for the future of placemaking in that they are being used to reclaim, reinvigorate and activate spaces. These online neighborhood and event-centric groups and forums provide a convenient non-physical space for public discourse and discussion through digital networked interactions to implement change on a hyper-local level; this theory is sometimes referred to as Urban Acupuncture. This type of shift towards a more crowd-sourced planning method can lead to the creation of more relevant and useful and inclusive places with greater sense of place.

Other new technologies have also been used in placemaking, such as the WiFi-based project created by D.C. Denison and Michael Oh at Boston's South Station and other locations around Boston. The project was backed by The Boston Globe. The Pulse of Boston used local WiFi signals to create online hyperlocal communities in five different locations around the city.

Notable people

Literature 

 The Image of the City, by Kevin Lynch (1960)
 The Death and Life of Great American Cities, by Jane Jacobs (1961)
 Place and Space: The Perspective of Experience, by Yi-Fu Tuan (1977)
 Placemaking: The Art and Practice of Building Communities] by Lynda H. Schneekloth & Robert G. Shibley (1995)
 The Great Good Place, by Ray Oldenburg (1989)
 The Ecology of Place, by Timothy Beatley and Kristy Manning (1997)
 How to Turn a Place Around, by Project for Public Spaces (2000)
 The Art of Placemaking: Interpreting Community Through Public Art and Urban Design, by Ronald Lee Fleming at The Townscape Institute (2007)
 The Routledge Handbook of Placemaking,  by Cara Courage, Tom Borrup, Maria Rosario Jackson, Kylie Legge, Anita Mckeown, Louise Platt, Jason Schupbach (2021)

See also
 Project for Public Spaces
 Community of place
 Place syntax
 Urban informatics
 Urban vitality
 Walkability
 Cyclability

References

Articles
 Pierce, Martin, Murphy, "Relational Place-Making: the networked politics of place." The Royal Geographical Society (2010): 55.
 Sharma, A. (2022). PLUS GreeN: Reconciling Urban Streams and Greenways through Placemaking. European Journal of Architecture and Urban Planning, 1(2), 1–11. https://doi.org/10.24018/ejarch.2022.1.2.3

External links
 Sustainable placemaking site curated by Michigan State University professor
 Project for Public Spaces
  City Repair, Portland, Oregon Citizen activism for a more community-oriented and ecologically sustainable society
 Places: Forum of Design for the Public Realm, a placemaking journal
 VIDEO: The Atrium — An Example In Placemaking. Presented at The Canadian Institute of Planners 2013 conference
  Reconciling Urban Streams and Greenways through Placemaking, Herring run, Baltimore
 StreetPlans: Tactical Urbanism Projects

Community
Urban studies and planning terminology
Urban design
Landscape architecture